Rudkhan Castle; also Roodkhan Castle, is a brick and stone medieval fortress in Iran that was built by the Talysh people to defend against the Arab invaders during the Muslim conquest of Persia. With the fall of the Sasanian Empire, this area became a defensive position against the Arabs in the then-newly established Tabarestan.

Located 25 km southwest of Fuman city north of Iran in Gilan province, it is a military complex which was constructed during the Sasanian era (224-651), and later rebuilt in 1096 by the Nizari Isma'ilis for use by the Assassins. Its architects made use of natural mountainous features in the construction of the fort.

The Rudkhan Castle River originates in the surrounding heights and flows from south to north.

After crossing a mountainous winding route with dense forests, the first thing that one notices about the castle is its big entrance gate.

Rudkhan Castle sits at the two peaks of a mountain at elevations of 715 and 670 metres and contains strong fortifications and battlements at a length of 1,550 metres. The castle's 42 towers still stand intact.

Description 
Rudkhan Castle consists of two parts: Arg and Qorkhaneh. Arg is located in the western part of this building on two floors and its material is brick. The Qorkhaneh on the east side are dominated by two floors with multiple skylights and openings. There is also a spring between the castle and its deepest place.

The eastern part of the castle includes twelve entrances, a prison, an emergency door, a bath and a catchment. The western part has twelve entrances, the spring, the pond, the reservoir, the cold storage, the bath, the royal water basin and several residential units surrounded by towers and fortifications. Forty watchtowers surround the castle, where octagonal rooms are covered with domed arches. Sloping openings can be seen around the walls and towers, which are built for pouring molten material and firing projectiles. Since the castle's construction, it has never been invaded by an enemy and they have not been able to conquer it.

Geological features 

Rudkhan Castle is geologically built in an area that is known as Gasht complex in the geological division and according to Stocklin's studies, it consists of two phases of transformation. The first is related to the Precambrian - Paleozoic with high metamorphic intensity and the second to the Mesozoic time with low absolute metamorphic intensity.

According to geological surveys, the presence of iron reserves in this area has a high probability. Evidence of ancient mining activity has been reported in the area. For example there are melting residues in this area.

Gallery

See also
Architecture of Iran
List of castles in Iran

External links

Worldisround.com
Ipm.ac.ir
WiseItinerary

https://web.archive.org/web/20101213150948/http://www.hamshahri.net/hamnews/1385/850431/news/theatre.htm#s15027
https://web.archive.org/web/20080531115155/http://www.aftab.ir/articles/art_culture/cultural_heritage/c5c1181815532_rodkhan_p1.php
http://www.magiran.com/npview.asp?ID=1433391
https://web.archive.org/web/20120326093642/http://rasekhoon.net/article/show-23181.aspx
http://www.aftabir.com/articles/view/art_culture/cultural_heritage/c5c1214136597_burg_rodkhan_p1.php/%D8%AF%DA%98-%D9%82%D9%84%D8%B9%D9%87-%D8%B1%D9%88%D8%AF%D8%AE%D8%A7%D9%86-%DB%8C%D8%A7%D8%AF%D9%85%D8%A7%D9%86-%D8%A8%D8%A7%D8%B3%D8%AA%D8%A7%D9%86%DB%8C-%D8%AA%D9%88%D8%B1%DB%8C%D8%B3%D8%AA%DB%8C-%D8%A7%DB%8C%D8%B1%D8%A7%D9%86

Buildings and structures completed in the 11th century
Castles in Iran
Architecture in Iran
Buildings and structures in Gilan Province
Castles of the Nizari Ismaili state
Sasanian castles
National works of Iran
History of Talysh